First Women Bank Limited (FWBL) is a commercial bank located in Karachi, Pakistan chartered to meet the special needs of women.

History 
The blueprint for infrastructure of the Bank was designed by Akram Khatoon, a senior banker who worked for the Muslim Commercial Bank for 27 years. She presented it in 1988 to the Prime Minister Benazir Bhutto. who approved to set up the bank in December 1988. The Bank commenced its business on 2 December 1988 with a paid up capital of PKR 100 Million.

The Government of Pakistan now owns majority shareholding (more than 80%) in the bank. The remaining shares are held by the five big commercial banks – National Bank of Pakistan, Habib Bank Limited, Muslim Commercial Bank Limited, United Bank Limited and Allied Bank Limited.

Privatization 
The Cabinet Committee on Privatisation (CCoP) approved transaction structures for the privatization of First Women Bank Ltd.

References

External links

 

Banks of Pakistan
Government-owned banks of Pakistan
Women in Pakistan